Ghazanfari Khan Ahmad-e Sofla (also Romanized as Ghaẕanfarī Khān Aḩmad-e Soflá; also known as Ghaẕanfarī) is a village in Babuyi Rural District, Basht District, Basht County, Kohgiluyeh and Boyer-Ahmad Province, Iran. At the 2006 census, its population was 114, in 26 families.

References 

Populated places in Basht County